Avtozavodskaya is a station on the Avtozavodskaya line of the Nizhny Novgorod Metro. The authorities planned to open the station as part of the initial phase from Moskovskaya 

It opened on 8 August 1987 in the second phase of construction with Komsomolskaya station. It is in the Avtozavodsky District of Nizhny Novgorod which gets its name from GAZ automobile factory.

References

Nizhny Novgorod Metro stations
Railway stations in Russia opened in 1987
Railway stations located underground in Russia